Bernd Drechsel (28 October 1953 – 21 January 2017) was a German wrestler who competed in the 1972 Summer Olympics. He was born in Karl-Marx-Stadt.

References

External links
 

1953 births
2017 deaths
Sportspeople from Chemnitz
Olympic wrestlers of East Germany
Wrestlers at the 1972 Summer Olympics
German male sport wrestlers